is a railway station on the Tenjin Ōmuta Line in Chikushino, Fukuoka, Japan, operated by the private railway operator Nishi-Nippon Railroad (Nishitetsu). It is the newest station on any of Nishitetsu’s lines.

Lines 

Layout 
The station has two side platforms serving two tracks. The two platforms can accommodate trains with seven cars.

Platforms

Adjacent stations

History
The station opened on March 27, 2010. Construction cost approximately 700 million yen.

See also
 List of railway stations in Japan

References

External links

 Nishitetsu station information (JR East) 

Railway stations in Fukuoka Prefecture
Railway stations in Japan opened in 2010